The WPA World Team Championship is a pool World Championship for national teams sanctioned by the World Pool-Billiard Association (WPA). the event founded in 2010 by the WPA and was held every two years until 2014.

History 

The first edition of the World Team Championship was contested in 2010 in Hanover. The British team of Darren Appleton, Daryl Peach, Imran Majid, Karl Boyes and Mark Gray won the tournament in the final against the Philippines.

The next two editions of the championship were contested in Beijing. The third edition in 2012 was won by the Chinese Taipei team of Chang Jung-lin, Fu Che-wei, Ko Pin-yi and Chuo Chieh-yu defeating Japan in the final. 

The third event in 2014 was won by the Chinese team of Liu Haitao, Wang Can, Fu Xiaofang, Liu Shasha and Dang Jinhu defeating the Philippines in the final.

Format 
In 2010, 42 teams participated in the championship, competing first in a double-elimination tournament until 16 teams were left in the tournament where they played a single-elimination tournament. Starting in 2012, 24 teams took part each year. Teams were divided into groups of four in a round robin, with the winners and runners-up of each group (as well as best placed third placed teams) progressing in the final group of 16, which then played in single-elimination format.

Teams consist of four to six players, including at least one woman. A match consists of two games each in the disciplines of eight-ball, nine-ball and ten-ball. The games of eight-ball and nine-ball are played singly, while the ten-ball games are played as Scotch-doubles. One nine-ball and ten-ball game must be played by a woman. For each game won, the corresponding team gets one point. In the group stage, a team receives three points for a win and one point for a draw. When there is a tie in the knockout round, the winner is determined by a shootout.

Results

References

External links 
 

 
World championships in pool